Chinese Taipei  competed at the 2016 Summer Olympics in Rio de Janeiro, Brazil, from 5 to 21 August 2016. "Chinese Taipei" is the designated name used by Taiwan to participate in some international organizations and almost all sporting events, including the Olympic Games. Neither the common name "Taiwan" nor the official name "Republic of China" would be used due primarily to opposition from the People's Republic of China. This was also the region's ninth consecutive appearance at the Summer Olympics.

The Chinese Taipei Olympic Committee sent a team of 57 athletes, 26 men and 31 women, to compete in 18 sports at the Games. For only the third time in Olympic history, Chinese Taipei roster featured more female athletes than males. Among the sporting events represented by the nation's athletes, Chinese Taipei made its Olympic debut in equestrian jumping and golf (new to the 2016 Games), as well as its return to gymnastics, boxing, and wrestling after more than fifteen years.

World-ranked tennis star Lu Yen-hsun, table tennis players Huang I-hua and London 2012 fourth-place finalist Chuang Chih-yuan, and trap shooter Lin Yi-chun highlighted the list of athletes to make the Chinese Taipei roster for their fourth Olympics. Apart from the veterans, twelve Taiwanese athletes previously competed in London, with weightlifter Hsu Shu-ching leading them as the only medalist to return for her second appearance in Rio de Janeiro. Other notable athletes from Chinese Taipei also featured world's top 30 golfers Candie Kung and Teresa Lu, and lone show jumper Isheau Wong, who eventually served as the nation's second female flag bearer in the opening ceremony (the first having done so in 2008).

Chinese Taipei left Rio de Janeiro with only three medals (one gold and two bronze), a slight improvement on the team's performance at the previous Games. Among the medalists were the women's archery team (led by Tan Ya-ting, who eventually finished among the top eight in the individual recurve), and weightlifters Kuo Hsing-chun (women's 58 kg) and Hsu, who upgraded her silver from London to a golden finish in the women's 53 kg category. For the first time in history, Chinese Taipei did not obtain any medals in taekwondo, since the sport was officially added to the Olympic program in 2000.

Medalists

Archery
 
Three Taiwanese archers qualified for the men's events after having secured a top eight finish in the team recurve at the 2015 World Archery Championships in Copenhagen, Denmark. Another set of three archers qualified for the women's events by virtue of the nation's podium finish in the team recurve competition at the 2016 Archery World Cup meet in Antalya, Turkey.

The Taiwanese archery team for the Games, led by London 2012 Olympian Tan Ya-ting, was announced on 26 February 2016, based on their results at the Olympic Team Trials.

Men

Women

Athletics
 
Chinese Taipei athletes have so far achieved qualifying standards in the following athletics events (up to a maximum of 3 athletes in each event):

Track & road events

Field events

Badminton

Chinese Taipei has qualified four badminton players for each of the following events into the Olympic tournament. World no. 7 seed Chou Tien-chen and London 2012 Olympian Tai Tzu-ying were selected among the top 34 individual shuttlers each in the men's and women's singles, while Lee Sheng-mu and Tsai Chia-hsin secured the men's doubles spot by virtue of their top 16 finish in the BWF World Rankings as of 5 May 2016.

Boxing
 
Chinese Taipei has entered two boxers to compete in each of the following weight classes into the Olympic boxing tournament, signifying the nation's comeback to the sport since 1996. Chen Nien-chin had claimed her Olympic spot with a quarterfinal victory at the World Championships in Astana, Kazakhstan, while lightweight boxer Lai Chu-en secured an additional Olympic place on the Taiwanese roster at the 2016 AIBA World Qualifying Tournament in Baku, Azerbaijan.

Cycling

Road
Chinese Taipei has qualified one rider in the women's Olympic road race by virtue of a top 100 individual placement in the 2016 UCI World Rankings.

Track
Following the completion of the 2016 UCI Track Cycling World Championships, Chinese Taipei has entered one rider to compete in women's omnium at the Olympics, by virtue of her final individual UCI Olympic ranking in that event.

Omnium

Equestrian
 
Chinese Taipei has entered one jumping rider into the Olympic equestrian competition, by virtue of a top individual finish at the FEI qualifying meet for Asia & Oceania in Hagen, Germany.

Jumping

Golf 

Chinese Taipei has entered four golfers (two per gender) into the Olympic tournament. Lin Wen-tang (world no. 315), Pan Cheng-tsung (world no. 256), Candie Kung (world no. 32) and Teresa Lu (world no. 28) qualified directly among the top 60 eligible players for their respective individual events based on the IGF World Rankings as of 11 July 2016.

Gymnastics

Artistic
Chinese Taipei has entered one artistic gymnast into the Olympic competition for the first time since 2000. Lee Chih-kai had claimed his Olympic spot in the men's apparatus and all-around events at the Olympic Test Event in Rio de Janeiro.

Men

Judo

Chinese Taipei has qualified two judokas for each of the following weight classes at the Games. Lien Chia-ling was ranked among the top 14 eligible judokas for women in the IJF World Ranking List of 30 May 2016, while Tsai Ming-yen at men's extra-lightweight (60 kg) earned a continental quota spot from the Asian region as Chinese Taipei's top-ranked judoka outside of direct qualifying position.

Rowing

Chinese Taipei has qualified one boat in the women's single sculls for the Olympics at the 2016 Asia & Oceania Continental Qualification Regatta in Chungju, South Korea.

Qualification Legend: FA=Final A (medal); FB=Final B (non-medal); FC=Final C (non-medal); FD=Final D (non-medal); FE=Final E (non-medal); FF=Final F (non-medal); SA/B=Semifinals A/B; SC/D=Semifinals C/D; SE/F=Semifinals E/F; QF=Quarterfinals; R=Repechage

Sailing
 
Chinese Taipei has received a spare Olympic berth from the International Sailing Federation to send a windsurfer competing in the men's RS:X class to the Olympic regatta.

M = Medal race; EL = Eliminated – did not advance into the medal race

Shooting
 
Taiwanese shooters have achieved quota places for the following events by virtue of their best finishes at the 2014 and 2015 ISSF World Championships, the 2015 ISSF World Cup series, and Asian Championships, as long as they obtained a minimum qualifying score (MQS) as of 31 March 2016. The shooting team was named to the Olympic roster on 9 June 2016, with trap specialist Lin Yi-chun going to her fourth Games.

Qualification Legend: Q = Qualify for the next round; q = Qualify for the bronze medal (shotgun)

Swimming

Chinese Taipei has received a Universality invitation from FINA to send two swimmers (one male and one female) to the Olympics.

Table tennis

Chinese Taipei has fielded a team of six athletes into the table tennis competition at the Games. Chen Chien-an scored a second-stage draw victory to book one of six remaining Olympic spots in the men's singles at the Asian Qualification Tournament in Hong Kong. Meanwhile, London 2012 semifinalist Chuang Chih-yuan, Chen Szu-yu, and Cheng I-ching were automatically selected among the top 22 eligible players each in their respective singles events based on the ITTF Olympic Rankings.

Chiang Hung-chieh and Huang Yi-hua were each awarded the third spot to build the men's and women's teams for the Games by virtue of a top 10 national finish in the ITTF Olympic Rankings.

Men

Women

Taekwondo
 
Chinese Taipei entered three athletes into the taekwondo competition at the Olympics. Chuang Chia-chia qualified automatically for the women's welterweight category (67 kg) by finishing in the top 6 WTF Olympic rankings. Meanwhile, 2015 World champion Liu Wei-ting and Huang Huai-hsuan secured the remaining spots on the Chinese Taipei team by virtue of their top two finish respectively in the men's welterweight (80 kg) and women's flyweight category (49 kg) at the 2016 Asian Qualification Tournament in Manila, Philippines.

Tennis

Chinese Taipei has entered five tennis players into the Olympic tournament. Three-time Olympian Lu Yen-hsun (world no. 97) and Hsieh Su-wei (world no. 72), qualified directly among the top 56 eligible players for their respective singles events based on the ATP and WTA World Rankings as of 6 June 2016.

Having been directly entered to the singles, Hsieh also opted to play with her partner Chuang Chia-jung in the women's doubles, while sisters Chan Hao-ching and Chan Yung-jan teamed up together in the same tournament by virtue of the former's top-10 WTA ranking.

Hsieh was scheduled to play in the women's singles and the women's doubles (partnered with Chuang), but withdrew before the tournament, leaving Chuang unable to play and find another partner that have an enough rank to play with.

Weightlifting

Weightlifters from Chinese Taipei have qualified three men's and four women's quota places for the Rio Olympics based on their combined team standing by points at the 2014 and 2015 IWF World Championships. The team must allocate these places to individual athletes by 20 June 2016.

The weightlifting team, highlighted by London 2012 silver medalist Hsu Shu-ching (later granted the gold medal because of the original champion's positive blood test result for the banned steroids), was named to the Olympic roster on 11 May 2016.

Wrestling

Chinese Taipei has qualified one wrestler for the women's freestyle 69 kg into the Olympic competition, as a result of her top two finish at the 2016 Asian Qualification Tournament, signifying the nation's Olympic comeback to the sport for the first time since 1988.

Women's freestyle

See also
Chinese Taipei at the 2016 Summer Paralympics

References

External links 

 
 

Olympics
Nations at the 2016 Summer Olympics
2016